KRK or Krk can mean:

Places
Krk, an island in the Adriatic Sea
Krk (town), on Krk island, Croatia 
Roman Catholic Diocese of Krk
Principality of Krk

Facilities and structures
John Paul II International Airport Kraków-Balice, Poland, IATA code
Kot Radha Kishan railway station, Kasur, Punjab, Pakistan, station code
Kirkconnel railway station, Dumfries and Galloway, Scotland, station code
Krk Bridge, Croatia
Krk LNG terminal, Croatia

People
Kamaal Rashid Khan, an Indian actor

Fictional characters
 Keval Ram Kushwaha, in 2012 Indian TV show Madhubala – Ek Ishq Ek Junoon

Other uses
Kerek language (ISO 639 code)
KRK Systems, a music device maker
Polish National Criminal Register, see criminal record

See also

 
 
 Kirk (disambiguation)